This article presents a list of the historical events and publications of Australian literature during 1978.

Events 
 Jessica Anderson won the 1978 Miles Franklin Award for Tirra Lirra by the River

Major publications

Books 
 Jessica Anderson – Tirra Lirra by the River
 David Malouf – An Imaginary Life
 Christopher Koch – The Year of Living Dangerously

Science fiction and fantasy 
 A. Bertram Chandler — To Keep the Ship
 David Lake — The Gods of Xuma, or, Barsoom revisited

Children's and young adult fiction 
 Joan Phipson – Keep Calm
 Patricia Wrightson – The Dark Bright Water

Poetry 
 Lee Cataldi – Invitation to a Marxist lesbian party
 Jennifer Maiden – Birthstones

Non-fiction 
 Patsy Adam-Smith – The ANZACS
 Mary Durack – The End of Dreaming
 Wendy Lowenstein – Weevils in the Flour
 Elyne Mitchell – Light Horse: The Story of Australia's Mounted Troops

Awards and honours

Order of Australia
 Margaret Hasluck appointed Dame of the Order of Australia (AD) for "pre-eminent achievement in the fields of literature and history and for extraordinary and meritorious public service to Australia".

Lifetime achievement

Literary

Children and Young Adult

Births 
A list, ordered by date of birth (and, if the date is either unspecified or repeated, ordered alphabetically by surname) of births in 1978 of Australian literary figures, authors of written works or literature-related individuals follows, including year of death.

 28 December — Holly Throsby, novelist and musician

Unknown date
 Brett McBean, horror, thriller and speculative fiction writer
 Fiona McFarlane, novelist and short story writer
 Andrew O'Connor, novelist

Deaths 
A list, ordered by date of death (and, if the date is either unspecified or repeated, ordered alphabetically by surname) of deaths in 1978 of Australian literary figures, authors of written works or literature-related individuals follows, including year of birth.

 9 March – John K. Ewers, novelist, poet, schoolteacher and short story writer 
 16 April – Barbara Vernon, playwright, screenwriter and radio announcer
 23 May – Rose Lindsay, artist's model, author, and printmaker
 15 June – Paul McGuire, author, public servant and diplomat
 23 July – T. Inglis Moore, writer, anthologist and academic
 24 July 1978 – Annie Rattray Rentoul, children's poet and story writer (b. 1882)
27 September – Margaret Horder, artist and children's book illustrator (b. 1903)
 7 December – Helen Haenke, poet, playwright and artist

See also 
 1978 in Australia
 1978 in literature
 1978 in poetry
 List of years in Australian literature
 List of years in literature

References

 
Australian literature by year
20th-century Australian literature
1978 in literature